Kingsburgh may refer to:

 Kingsburgh, KwaZulu-Natal, South Africa
 Kingsburgh, Skye, Highland, Scotland
 Kingsburgh, California, former name of Kingsburg, California, United States
 Kingsborough, Queensland, a former mining town in Australia